Magic Records Sp. z o.o., is a Polish record label founded in 1994 in Warsaw. Since 1998 label is a subsidiary of Universal Music Poland. Company CEO is Jan Kubicki.

In 1990s label specialized in dance, techno and electronic music releasing albums by such artists as DJ'e TT, DR Marek, Exdance, I&I, MC Diva and Top One among others. In later years Magic Records expanded and has been releasing also pop artists such as Ewa Farna, Margaret and Honorata Skarbek among others. On various licences label released in Poland albums by such artists as Gordon Haskell, Andrea Corr, Vanilla Ninja, Volbeat, Alexander Rybak, Zaz, DJ BoBo and Basia among others.

Artists

Current

Marcin Kindla
Sanah
bryska
Pączki w Tłuszczu
Wiktoria Zwolińska
TYNSKY
Stan Zapalny
Amelia Andryszczyk

Former
  
Anna Turska
Blog 27
Candy Girl
DJ'e TT
DR Marek
Exdance
I&I
Jacek Perkowski
Jarzębina 
Joanna Dark
Kaja Paschalska
Kindla
Małgorzata Kosik
Mandaryna
MC Diva
Piotr Rubik
Pewex
Robert M
Szymon Wydra & Carpe Diem
Top One
Urszula Kasprzak
Queens
Ewa Farna
Honorata Skarbek
Janusz Radek
Margaret

References

External links
 Official website

Polish Limited Liability Companies
Universal Music Group
Polish record labels